Andrea Santarelli (born 3 June 1993) is an Italian right-handed épée fencer, 2022 team European champion, two-time Olympian, and 2016 team Olympic silver medalist. 

Santarelli competed in the 2016 Rio de Janeiro Olympic Games and the 2020 Tokyo Olympic Games.

Medal record

Olympic Games

World Championship

European Championship

Grand Prix

World Cup

References

External links
 
 

1993 births
Living people
Italian male fencers
Fencers at the 2016 Summer Olympics
Olympic fencers of Italy
Olympic silver medalists for Italy
Olympic medalists in fencing
Medalists at the 2016 Summer Olympics
People from Foligno
Fencers at the 2015 European Games
European Games medalists in fencing
European Games bronze medalists for Italy
Fencers of Fiamme Oro
World Fencing Championships medalists
Fencers at the 2020 Summer Olympics
Sportspeople from the Province of Perugia
20th-century Italian people
21st-century Italian people